Ensley may refer to:

People

Given name
 Ensley Bingham (born 1961), British boxer
 Ensley A. Carpenter (–before 1910), American physician
 Ensley Llewellyn (born  1905), American  Military Officer

Surname
 Elizabeth Piper Ensley (1848–1919), American suffragist
 Harold Ensley (1912–2005), American radio and television personality
 Newell Houston Ensley (1852–1888), American Baptist minister and civil rights activist

Places 
 Ensley (Birmingham), Alabama, United States
 Ensley, Florida, United States
 Ensley Township, Michigan, United States

Other uses
 Ensley, a 2018 album by Pink Siifu